Jennifer Davidson is an American bobsledder who competed from the late 1990s to the early 2000s. She won two silver medals in the two-woman event at the FIBT World Championships, earning them in 2000 and 2001.

Davidson is best known for her controversy with her bobsleigh partner Jean Racine (now Prahm) prior to the bobsleigh trials for the 2002 Winter Olympics in Salt Lake City where the pair split when Racine dumped Davidson on December 13, 2001. Davidson filed an arbitration against the US Bobsleigh and Skeleton Federation, but eventually withdrew it. She served as a forerunner in the 2002 Olympic bobsled events.

References
Bobsleigh two-woman world championship medalists since 2000
New York Times January 14, 2002 article on Davidson demanding a race-off for the 2002 Winter Olympic team
New York Times January 17, 2002 article on the Racine-Davidson breakup

American female bobsledders
Living people
Year of birth missing (living people)
21st-century American women